John Robertson Ruttan is a former mayor of Nanaimo, British Columbia, Canada.

Background

Ruttan was born in Anchorage, Alaska and later moved with his parents to Victoria, British Columbia. His mother was born in Nome, Alaska; his father in Manitoba.  His ancestors were Loyalists from New York and New Jersey, who arrived from Lorraine, France in the 1600s, and settled in Hay Bay, Ontario. He was educated at Monterey Elementary School, Oak Bay High School and Victoria College. He has lived in the Nanaimo area for over 45 years.

Ruttan has owned Nanaimo Travel and Cruise since 1980. He has also been the president of Ruttan Holdings since 1993. In 2008 the Nanaimo Chamber of Commerce recognized Ruttan with the Sterling Community Award for "Citizen of the Year". He currently resides in Lantzville, British Columbia with his wife Dianne. They have two adult children.

2008 Election

He was elected in Nanaimo's 2008 municipal election receiving 9032 out of 19539 votes compared to 6975 votes received by city councilor Diane Brennan. The incumbent candidate Gary Korpan received 3119 votes and Larry Iwaskow came in fourth place with 413 votes.

Notes

External links
Campaign website

Living people
Mayors of Nanaimo
Politicians from Anchorage, Alaska
Victoria College, British Columbia alumni
Year of birth missing (living people)